is a subway station located in Chūō-ku, Fukuoka. It is connected to Tenjin Station and Nishitetsu Fukuoka (Tenjin) Station through the Tenjin Chikagai (天神地下街), an underground shopping street. The station symbol is children playing the "Tōryanse" game (similar to the London Bridge game).

Lines 

Transit to/from
   
Nishi-Nippon Railroad: Tenjin Ōmuta Line

Platforms

History 
The station opened on 3 February 2005 as the western terminus of the Nanakuma Line.

Starting on 27 March 2023, all services will continue west with the opening of a  extension to Hakata Station.

References

External links
 Tenjin-Minami Station 

Railway stations in Fukuoka Prefecture
Railway stations in Fukuoka, Fukuoka